The 1966 Calgary Stampeders finished in 4th place in the Western Conference with a 6–9–1 record and failed to make the playoffs.

Regular season

Season standings

Season schedule

Awards and records

1966 CFL All-Stars

References

Calgary Stampeders seasons
1966 Canadian Football League season by team